Rockledge High School is located in Rockledge, Florida, USA, and is part of the Brevard Public Schools District.

History
Rockledge High School was founded in 1970 on the site formerly named Cocoa High School.

Academics

AICE Program
In 2005, Rockledge High School became the first in the school district to offer the Advanced International Certificate of Education (AICE). In 2007, Rockledge was designated an International Fellowship Center, a special recognition only available to schools with an AICE program, making it only the 19th in the world and the 5th in the U.S. to gain this title.

Athletics
In 2009, the estimated income to fund sports at the school was $144,502, equivalent to $312 per athlete. Its primary sports rival is Cocoa High School.

American football
In 2013, Rockledge alumnus and NFL player Laurent Robinson donated 15 Shockbox concussion sensors to the school. Rockledge was the first high school in Florida to use such technology to monitor its players, which will occur throughout the 2013-14 season in collaboration with researchers from the University of South Florida.

The school won the state championship in 3A football in 2001 and 2002.

Rockledge also won the state championship in 4A baseball in 2004.

Alumni

Laurent Robinson 2003 - professional American football player 
Mel Mitchell - professional American football player
Drew Parrish - baseball player
Andrea Zuvich 2003 - historian and author.

Footnotes 

Brevard Public Schools
Cocoa, Florida
Educational institutions established in 1970
High schools in Brevard County, Florida
Public high schools in Florida
1970 establishments in Florida